Hiura (written: 日浦 or 樋浦) is a Japanese surname. Notable people with the surname include:

, Japanese actor and voice actor
, Japanese shogi player
Keston Hiura (born 1996), American baseball player

Japanese-language surnames